Elections to Belfast City Council were held on 17 May 1989 on the same day as the other Northern Irish local government elections. The election used nine district electoral areas to elect a total of 51 councillors, most representing the more heavily populated north and west.

The UUP remained the largest party, and Reg Empey became the Lord Mayor.

Election results

Note: "Votes" are the first preference votes.

Districts summary

|- class="unsortable" align="centre"
!rowspan=2 align="left"|Ward
! % 
!Cllrs
! % 
!Cllrs
! %
!Cllrs
! %
!Cllrs
! %
!Cllrs
! %
!Cllrs
! %
!Cllrs
! %
!Cllrs
!rowspan=2|TotalCllrs
|- class="unsortable" align="center"
!colspan=2 bgcolor="" | UUP
!colspan=2 bgcolor="" | Sinn Féin
!colspan=2 bgcolor=""| SDLP
!colspan=2 bgcolor="" | DUP
!colspan=2 bgcolor="" | Alliance
!colspan=2 bgcolor="" | Workers' Party
!colspan=2 bgcolor="" | PUP
!colspan=2 bgcolor="white"| Others
|-
|align="left"|Balmoral
|bgcolor="40BFF5"|34.9
|bgcolor="40BFF5"|2
|0.0
|0
|14.3
|1
|19.3
|1
|19.0
|1
|2.1
|0
|0.0
|0
|10.4
|0
|5
|-
|align="left"|Castle
|bgcolor="40BFF5"|24.6
|bgcolor="40BFF5"|1
|3.8
|0
|19.2
|1
|16.6
|1
|8.8
|1
|4.1
|0
|0.0
|0
|22.9
|2
|6
|-
|align="left"|Court
|19.8
|1
|2.3
|0
|0.0
|0
|15.8
|1
|0.0
|0
|3.5
|0
|24.2
|1
|bgcolor="#0077FF"|34.4
|bgcolor="#0077FF"|2
|6
|-
|align="left"|Laganbank
|bgcolor="40BFF5"|31.6
|bgcolor="40BFF5"|2
|7.7
|0
|20.8
|1
|12.0
|1
|19.0
|1
|4.9
|0
|0.0
|0
|4.0
|0
|5
|-
|align="left"|Lower Falls
|0.0
|0
|bgcolor="#008800"|61.0
|bgcolor="#008800"|3
|28.5
|2
|0.0
|0
|1.2
|0
|9.3
|0
|0.0
|0
|0.0
|0
|5
|-
|align="left"|Oldpark
|22.8
|2
|bgcolor="#008800"|37.8
|bgcolor="#008800"|3
|8.9
|0
|15.8
|1
|3.3
|0
|11.4
|1
|0.0
|0
|0.0
|0
|6
|-
|align="left"|Pottinger
|25.7
|2
|5.8
|0
|0.0
|0
|bgcolor="#D46A4C"|40.1
|bgcolor="#D46A4C"|2
|12.1
|1
|5.0
|0
|0.0
|0
|11.3
|1
|6
|-
|align="left"|Upper Falls
|0.0
|0
|bgcolor="#008800"|49.5
|bgcolor="#008800"|2
|41.9
|2
|2.2
|0
|2.6
|0
|3.1
|0
|0.0
|0
|0.7
|0
|5
|-
|align="left"|Victoria
|bgcolor="40BFF5"|39.5
|bgcolor="40BFF5"|3
|0.0
|0
|0.0
|0
|23.7
|2
|31.0
|2
|2.5
|0
|0.0
|0
|3.3
|0
|7
|- class="unsortable" class="sortbottom" style="background:#C9C9C9"
|align="left"| Total
|21.7
|14
|18.7
|8
|16.1
|8
|14.8
|8
|10.9
|6
|5.3
|1
|2.5
|1
|10.0
|5
|51
|-
|}

District results

Balmoral

1985: 2 x UUP, 2 x DUP, 1 x Alliance
1989: 2 x UUP, 2 x DUP, 1 x Alliance, 1 x SDLP
1985-1989 Change: SDLP gain from DUP

Castle

1985: 2 x UUP, 1 SDLP, 1 x DUP, 1 x Alliance, 1 x Independent Unionist 
1989: 2 x Independent Unionist, 1 x UUP, 1 SDLP, 1 x DUP, 1 x Alliance 
1985-1989 Change: Independent Unionist gain from UUP

Court

1985: 2 x UUP, 1 x DUP, 1 x PUP, 1 x Protestant Unionist, 1 x Independent Unionist
1989: 2 x UUP, 1 x DUP, 1 x PUP, 1 x Protestant Unionist, 1 x Independent Unionist
1985-1989 Change: No change

Laganbank

1985: 2 x UUP, 1 x SDLP, 1 x Alliance, 1 x DUP 
1989: 2 x UUP, 1 x SDLP, 1 x Alliance, 1 x DUP 
1985-1989 Change: No change

Lower Falls

1985: 3 x Sinn Féin, 1 x SDLP, 1 x Alliance
1989: 3 x Sinn Féin, 2 x SDLP
1985-1989 Change: SDLP gain from Alliance

Oldpark

1985: 2 x Sinn Féin, 1 x UUP, 1 x SDLP, 1 x DUP, 1 x Workers' Party
1989: 2 x Sinn Féin, 2 x UUP, 1 x SDLP, 1 x Workers' Party
1985-1989 Change: UUP gain from DUP

Pottinger

1985: 3 x DUP, 2 x UUP, 1 x Alliance
1989: 2 x DUP, 2 x UUP, 1 x Alliance, 1 Independent Unionist
1985-1989 Change: Independent Unionist gain from DUP

Upper Falls

1985: 2 x Sinn Féin, 2 x SDLP, 1 x Alliance
1989: 3 x Sinn Féin, 2 x SDLP
1985-1989 Change: Sinn Féin gain from Alliance

Victoria

1985: 3 x UUP, 2 x Alliance, 2 x DUP
1989: 3 x UUP, 2 x Alliance, 2 x DUP
1985-1989 Change: No change

References

Belfast City Council elections
Belfast